is a video game released in 1992 by Kemco for the Super NES. It is played with the Super Scope light gun.

The players assume the role of a soldier in flying power-armor assigned to destroy an army of malfunctioning defense robots commanded by a sentient bio-computer in its sudden war against humanity.

References

1992 video games
Kemco games
Light gun games
Rail shooters
Super Nintendo Entertainment System games
Video games developed in Japan